EFTA Surveillance Authority v Iceland was a case brought before the EFTA Court by the European Free Trade Association Surveillance Authority against Iceland following the Icesave dispute.

Following the final result of the 2011 Icelandic loan guarantee referendum, the European Free Trade Association Surveillance Authority (ESA) lodged a formal application with the EFTA Court. The case was opened on 15 December 2011, and has received defence and written observations from the governments of Iceland, UK, Netherlands, Norway and Liechtenstein as well as the EFTA Surveillance Authority and the European Commission.

The oral hearing in the case took place on 18 September 2012.  The judgment was delivered on 28 January 2013, in Iceland's favour. The court dismissed the application of the EFTA Surveillance Authority and ordered the authority to pay its own costs and the costs incurred by Iceland.

The case 
Following the collapse of Landsbanki in October 2008, the governments of the UK and Netherlands guaranteed for the deposits in Landsbanki's foreign branches. According to the Directive on deposit-guarantee schemes (94/19/EC) as implemented in Icelandic law (Act No. 98/1999), Iceland's deposit-guarantee schemes must cover up to €20,000 of deposits per person made in Landsbanki's foreign branches. Since the Icelandic deposit-guarantee scheme did not cover this sum, ESA claims that Iceland breached the Directive, specifically articles 3, 4, 7 and 10. In addition, ESA claims that Iceland has breached Article 4 of the EEA Agreement, by discriminating on grounds of nationality.

The Government of Iceland claims that it has implemented a deposit-guarantee scheme "in accordance with the manner in which the Directive has been implemented across the EU", satisfying the requirements of the Directive. Although the deposit-guarantee scheme was unable to "cope with the failure of 85% of the Icelandic banking system within a few days in October 2008", this does not require the Icelandic Government to be liable "to pay the sums specified in the Directive in the event that the deposit-guarantee scheme fails". Also, Iceland did not discriminate on the grounds of nationality, when it transferred domestic depositors to a new bank.

ESA answers that the wording "obligation of result" as used in the Directive "means that in all circumstances depositors must receive the minimum compensation required by the Directive." It is up to the member state to decide how this should take place. Concerning discriminating on grounds of nationality, ESA writes:

A further Icelandic reply concerning the "obligation of result" states:

The Government of Norway has filed a written observation with the court concerning a State's obligation to guarantee compensation with its own funds, writing:

Judge Dismissal 
A Norwegian judge, Per Christiansen was dismissed from the EFTA panel following remarks he made to the media, suggestions made in legal analysis, that he may have supported the EFTA case, and through the court, the UK and the Netherlands position.

Relevant law 
The Directive on deposit-guarantee schemes (94/19/EC)

 Article 3 (1)

 Article 4 (1)

Article 7 (1)

Article 10 (1)

EEA Agreement Article 4

See also 
Icesave dispute

References

External links 
Judgment of the Court
ESA Icesave case information page
Case at the EFTA Court
Directive on deposit-guarantee schemes (94/19/EC)
EEA Agreement

2013 in case law
EFTA Court cases
Great Recession in Europe
2013 in Iceland